Alexander Dmitrievich Zaytsev (June 3, 1903, Blagoveshchensk, Russian Empire – May 12, 1982, Leningrad) was a Russian and Soviet painter and art educator, who lived and worked in Leningrad. He was a member of the Leningrad Union of Artists, and professor of painting of the Repin Institute of Arts, who played an important role in the formation of the Leningrad school of painting.

Biography 
Alexander Dmitrievich Zaytsev was born on June 3, 1903, in Blagoveshchensk city on Amur River. In 1920-1924 he studied in Blagoveshchensk School of Industrial Art. In 1924 he comes to Leningrad and enters the VHUTEIN, where he studied with Osip Braz and Vasily Savinsky. In 1930 Zaytsev graduated from Art Institute as an artist of painting, his graduate work was a picture named «May Day in Leningrad».

Alexander Zaytsev participated in Art Exhibitions since 1928. He painted genre paintings, portraits, landscapes, and still lifes. In 1928-1932 Zaitsev was a member and exhibitor of the Leningrad association «Circle of Artists». Since 1932 he was a member of the Leningrad Union of the Soviet Artists. In 1930-1982 Alexander Zaytsev taught at the Repin Institute. He was Ph.D. in Art History (1943) and professor of painting since 1948, a Honored Art Worker of Russian Federation (1967), a head of personal studio of painting (1963-1982). In 1971 he was awarded the Order of Lenin.

Among his most known paintings were «Stonemasons» (1929), «Motherhood» (1930), «A Foundry of the Baltic Plant» (1933), «Fishermen on Onega Lake» (1935), «Kivach waterfall» (1938), «On the Neva river» (1947), «On the North» (1950), «A Spring» (1955), «Spring in Samarkhand» (1956), «Working settlement»  (1957), «Night on the Neva river» (1963), «A Portrait of fisher women Busarova»  (1964), «Toilers of the Sea» (1967), «Lenin and Maxim Gorky in Gorki» (1970), «Twilights», «In fishing collective farm in the North» (both 1975), and others.

Pupils 
 Nikolai Baskakov
 Dmitry Belyaev
 Zlata Bizova
 Valery Vatenin
 Nina Veselova
 Tatiana Gorb
 Abram Grushko
 Alexei Eriomin
 Vecheslav Zagonek
 Leonid Kabachek
 Tatiana Kopnina
 Maya Kopitseva
 Valeria Larina
 Sergei Lastochkin
 Anatoli Levitin
 Oleg Lomakin
 Valentina Monakhova
 Nikolai Mukho
 Alexander Naumov
 Anatoli Nenartovich
 Vladimir Proshkin
 Igor Razdrogin
 Galina Rumiantseva
 Mikhail Trufanov
 Yuri Tulin
 Nikolai Furmankov
 Boris Kharchenko
 Yuri Khukhrov
 Vladimir Chekalov
 Vitaliy Semenchenko
 and a lot of others.

See also
 Leningrad School of Painting
 List of 20th-century Russian painters
 List of painters of Saint Petersburg Union of Artists
 Saint Petersburg Union of Artists

References

Sources 
 Выставка произведений ленинградских художников. 1947 год. Живопись. Скульптура. Графика. Театрально-декорационная живопись. Каталог. Л., ЛССХ, 1948.
 Бойков В. Изобразительное искусство Ленинграда. Заметки о выставке ленинградских художников // Ленинградская правда, 1947, 29 ноября.
 Осенняя выставка произведений ленинградских художников. 1956 года. Каталог. — Л: Ленинградский художник, 1958. — с.11.
 1917 — 1957. Выставка произведений ленинградских художников. Каталог. — Л: Ленинградский художник, 1958. — с.14.
 Ленинград. Зональная выставка. — Л: Художник РСФСР, 1965. — с.21.
 Наш современник. Зональная выставка произведений ленинградских художников 1975 года. Каталог. — Л: Художник РСФСР, 1980. — с.15.
 Изобразительное искусство Ленинграда. Каталог выставки. — Л: Художник РСФСР, 1976. — с.19.
 Справочник членов Союза художников СССР. Том 1. — М: Советский художник, 1979. — с.389.
 Справочник членов Ленинградской организации Союза художников РСФСР. — Л: Художник РСФСР, 1980. — с.43.
 Художники народов СССР. Биобиблиографический словарь. — М: Искусство, 1983. — с.186-187.
 Matthew Cullerne Bown. A Dictionary of Twentieth Century Russian And Soviet Painters. 1900 — 1980s. — London: Izomar Limited, 1998.
 Sergei V. Ivanov. Unknown Socialist Realism. The Leningrad School. Saint Petersburg, NP-Print Edition, 2007. P.13, 15, 19, 357–360, 362, 364–366, 368, 371–373, 382, 384, 387, 398. , .
 Юбилейный Справочник выпускников Санкт-Петербургского академического института живописи, скульптуры и архитектуры имени И. Е. Репина Российской Академии художеств. 1915—2005. СПб., Первоцвет, 2007. С.35.
 Государственный Русский музей. Живопись первой половины ХХ века (К) / Альманах. Вып.226. СПб., Palace Edition, 2008. С.110-111.

1903 births
1982 deaths
People from Blagoveshchensk
People from Amur Oblast (Russian Empire)
20th-century Russian painters
Russian male painters
Soviet painters
Socialist realism
Recipients of the Order of Lenin
Members of the Leningrad Union of Artists
Repin Institute of Arts alumni
Leningrad School artists
Russian portrait painters
20th-century Russian male artists